Parque de Béisbol Alberto Romo Chávez (English: Alberto Romo Chavez Baseball Park) is a stadium in Aguascalientes, Mexico.  It is primarily used for baseball, and is the home field of the Rieleros de Aguascalientes Mexican League baseball team.  It holds 6,496 people and was built in 1938. The stadium is adjacent to Estadio Victoria.

References

Parque de Béisbol Alberto Romo Chávez
Sports venues in Aguascalientes
Mexican League ballparks
Parque de Béisbol Alberto Romo Chávez